A Distant Shore may refer to:

 A Distant Shore (album), an album by Tracey Thorn
 A Distant Shore (novel), a  novel by Caryl Phillips
 A Distant Shore: African Americans of D-Day, a television documentary program

See also
Distant Shores (disambiguation)